Novyella is a subgenus of the genus Plasmodium - all of which are parasites. The subgenus was created in 1963 by Corradetti et al. Species in this subgenus infect birds. It unites the avian malaria parasites with small erythrocytic meronts and elongated gametocytes.

Taxonomy 
This subgenus was created on the basis of morphology. Subsequent DNA studies showed it to be polyphetic. Its definition has been revised by Landau et al to contain only those species with a white/blue globule in the cytoplasm. Several of the species that were included in this subgenus have now been moved to a new subgenus Papernaia.

Species 
The type species is Plasmodium vaughani.

Description 

Species in the subgenus Novyella have the following characteristics:

 Mature schizonts are either smaller than or only slightly larger than the host nucleus. They contain scanty cytoplasm.
 Gametocytes are elongated. Sexual stages in this subgenus resemble those of Haemoproteus.
 Exoerythrocytic schizogony occurs in the mononuclear phagocyte system
 A blue, pale blue or white globule, frequently refractory, can be found in the cytoplasm.

References 

Plasmodium subgenera
Parasites of birds